There are 33 listed buildings (Swedish: byggnadsminne) in Norrbotten County.

Arjeplog Municipality
There are no listed buildings in Arjeplog  Municipality.

Arvidsjaur Municipality

Boden Municipality

Gällivare Municipality
There are no listed buildings in Gällivare  Municipality.

Haparanda Municipality

Jokkmokk Municipality

Kalix Municipality

Kiruna Municipality

Luleå Municipality

Pajala Municipality

Piteå Municipality

Älvsbyn Municipality

Överkalix Municipality

Övertorneå Municipality

External links

  Bebyggelseregistret

Listed buildings in Sweden